Franklyn Keith Musto OBE (born 12 January 1936) is a British sailor and businessman. He competed at the 1964 Summer Olympics in Tokyo and won a silver medal in the Flying Dutchman class and was reserve in the Flying Dutchman class for the 1972 Summer Olympics in Munich.

Musto began sailing aged 15. After National Service, he began work with engineer Ken Pearce and began working on sailing masts and sails. He went on to become a leading dingy sailor winning national championships 5 classes between 1955 and 1963. He competed at the 1964 Tokyo Olympics in the Flying Dutchman class and won a silver medal along with Tony Morgan.

After the Olympics he set up a sailmaking business, Musto & Hyde, along with Eddie Hyde in Rayleigh, Essex. Eventually he concentrated solely on sailing and outdoor clothing with his company Musto Clothing.

In 1973 he worked with the Japanese Olympic Sailing team.

As well the Olympics, Musto won medals at the 1963 & 1969 World Championships again in the Flying Dutchman class and gained a bronze medal in 2008 Vintage Yachting Games Dragon class.

Musto was appointed Officer of the Order of the British Empire (OBE) in the 2014 New Year Honours for services to the economy through Musto Clothing.

References

External links
 

1936 births
Living people
British male sailors (sport)
Sailors at the 1964 Summer Olympics – Flying Dutchman
Olympic medalists in sailing
Olympic sailors of Great Britain
Olympic silver medallists for Great Britain
British businesspeople
Officers of the Order of the British Empire
Medalists at the 1964 Summer Olympics
People from Burnham-on-Crouch
English Olympic medallists